Majnun (also Romanized as Majnūn and Majnoon; also known as Majaūn) is a village in Rudhaleh Rural District, Rig District, Ganaveh County, Bushehr Province, Iran. At the 2006 census, its population was 146, in 30 families.

References 

Populated places in Ganaveh County